{{Infobox television
| image       = Tom_green_show.png
| runtime     = 30 minutes (with commercials)
| company     = MTV Productions
| genre       = Sketch comedySurreal humorVariety
| creator     = Tom Green
| presenter   = Tom Green
| starring    = 
| opentheme   = "This Is The Tom Green Show"
| location    = Ottawa, Ontario, Canada
| country     = 
| writer      = 
| network     = 
| first_aired = 
| last_aired  = 
| related     = The New Tom Green ShowTom Green Live! / Tom Green's House Tonight
| num_seasons = Rogers 22 – 3 seasons (50 ep.)The Comedy Network – 2 seasons (26 ep.)MTV – 3 seasons (29 ep.)
}}The Tom Green Show is a television show, created by and starring Canadian comedian Tom Green, that first aired in September 1994. The series aired on Rogers Television 22, a community channel in Ottawa, Ontario until 1996, when a single pilot episode was made for CBC Television. The Comedy Network greenlit the show in 1997 and aired it for 2 seasons from 1998 to 1999.

In January 1999, the show moved to the United States and aired on MTV. The series stopped production in March 2000, due to Green's diagnosis of testicular cancer, but continued to appear on the channel via reruns and other promotional materials. In 2002, it was ranked #41 on TV Guides 50 Worst TV Shows of All Time. In 2003, the show was briefly revived as The New Tom Green Show with a more conventional late night talk show format. In 2006, Green launched Tom Green Live, a live call-in show for his website, which was later renamed Tom Green's House Tonight.

Synopsis

Personalities
The show was hosted by Tom Green, along with longtime friends Glenn Humplik and Phil Giroux. Derek Harvie, who co-wrote the show with Green, occasionally appeared in the segments. Many of the sketches were targeted at his parents, both of whom appear to be embarrassed and not impressed by their son's antics.

Stunts
Much of the show's humor was Tom Green's signature brand of shock comedy; numerous sketches featured Green performing bizarre or shocking acts in public, such as sucking on a cow's udder, and throwing plastic baby dolls at passing cars. This content was highly controversial, and the show quickly garnered many detractors. Perhaps most controversial was Green's treatment of his parents, who were often the targets of his pranks. In an infamous sketch, Green woke his parents in the middle of the night by placing a severed cow's head in their bed, a reference to a similar scene in The Godfather. During an interview with his parents for their 30th anniversary, he turned the discussion into asking questions about their sex life.

Despite the show's reputation for scatological and transgressive humor, several sketches featured Green performing in a responsible and respectful way, making fun of his juvenile persona. One of these sketches was "People Helpers", where Green and guest star Bruce McCulloch seriously assisted wheelchair users.

Recurring characters and sketches
The show also had a few recurring characters and sketches, including Billy Bob (a redneck who loved caramels and shaking his leg), Hockey Guy (a hockey player who would skate up in front of people and clumsily fall down), and a police station sketch.

He also explored the quirks of his friends. Green drew attention to Giroux's unusual laugh and discomfort with the smell of copper. One sketch aired when Glen had to urinate, but couldn't because Tom and the camera crew were in proximity (but still reasonably far away). They aired clips from a lengthy argument of whether a bear or a cougar would win in a fight.

"The Bum Bum Song"

When the show moved to MTV, Green released a single called "Lonely Swedish (The Bum Bum Song)", encouraging visitors to download the song off his website, burn it onto CDs and distribute it to friends. After airing the music video on his show and appealing to his audience to request it, the song became an instant number one hit on Total Request Live. He quickly called for the video to be retired because "it's not fair to 98 Degrees." Later, in his autobiography, he revealed that MTV had pressured him to do so in order to maintain the image that Total Request Live was, in fact, a live request show (the next week's episodes had been pre-taped on location, and the producers of the show were completely unaware of "The Bum Bum Song" at the time).

Special episodes
In one episode that aired in early 2000, Green visited his parents in Ottawa, Ontario with Monica Lewinsky, and used the occasion to fool local reporters into thinking that they would make an important "announcement" together, which turned out to be related to Monica's new interest in designing fabric handbags.

In 2000, Green made a one-hour special out of his testicular cancer surgery. It focused on his reaction to the cancer diagnosis, as well as his family's, and footage of the actual surgery was included in one scene. The episode received wide critical acclaim for revealing a vulnerable, human side of an otherwise juvenile television personality.

In March 2002, he also starred in and directed a one-hour special called The Tom Green Subway Monkey Hour, where he harassed strangers in Japan.

The New Tom Green Show
The show was briefly revived by MTV in 2003 as The New Tom Green Show, which was retooled to have more of a late-night talk show format, but was cancelled by MTV a few months after its premiere due to plummeting ratings. The show ran for 51 episodes from June 23, 2003, to September 5, 2003.

Tom Green Live! / Tom Green's House Tonight
On June 15, 2006, Tom Green launched Tom Green Live!, a live call-in talk show broadcast on his website TomGreen.com. It began as a partnership between Green and ManiaTV!. In 2008, the show was renamed Tom Green's House Tonight. The show takes place in Green's own living room in the Hollywood Hills overlooking the San Fernando Valley.

Rumored Hitler segment
A frequent rumor says that the show was cancelled because of an alleged segment where Green shows up at a Bar Mitzvah dressed as Adolf Hitler. Green, however, has repeatedly denied that such a segment exists. He mentions the rumor in his 2004 autobiography, Hollywood Causes Cancer'', stating that it started when some Boston teenagers were caught videotaping themselves performing that particular stunt and, when asked by security, they used the name "Tom Green".  Green says, "I would never do a mean-spirited, anti-Semitic joke like that—it's both abhorrent and not funny...To this day I still get asked about it, and it's annoying. So again, for the record, it didn't happen.  There is nobody on this planet that has ever seen this bit on tape because it does not exist. If it did exist, it would have certainly reared its ugly, hateful head on the Internet by now.  But it won't, because it doesn't exist. I've never put on a Hitler costume.  In fact, I've never even been to a Bar Mitzvah."

References

External links

 
 
 
 

1990s American sketch comedy television series
2000s American sketch comedy television series
1990s American television talk shows
2000s American television talk shows
1990s Canadian sketch comedy television series
2000s Canadian sketch comedy television series
1990s Canadian television talk shows
2000s Canadian television talk shows
1994 American television series debuts
1994 Canadian television series debuts
2000 American television series endings
2000 Canadian television series endings
MTV original programming
Canadian community channel television shows
Rogers TV original programming
Television shows filmed in Ottawa
CTV Comedy Channel original programming
Television controversies in Canada
Television controversies in the United States
Obscenity controversies in television